Alvania gradatoides is a species of minute sea snail with an operculum, a marine gastropod mollusk in the family Rissoidae.

Distribution 
 New Zealand
 Tasmania

Description 
Alvania gradatoides was originally discovered and described as Linemera gradatoides by Harold John Finlay in 1930.

References

External links 
 http://www.mollusca.co.nz/speciesdetail.php?speciesid=620&species=Alvinia%20(Linemera)%20gradatoides

Rissoidae
Gastropods described in 1930
Taxa named by Harold John Finlay